James Hartley (1811 – 24 May 1886) was a British  Conservative Party politician.

He was elected at the 1865 general election as a Member of Parliament (MP) for Sunderland, and held the seat until he stood down at the 1868 general election.

References

External links 
 

1811 births
1886 deaths
Conservative Party (UK) MPs for English constituencies
UK MPs 1865–1868